The Jesus movement was an evangelical Christian movement which began on the West Coast of the United States in the late 1960s and early 1970s and primarily spread throughout North America, Europe, and Central America, before it subsided in the late 1980s. Members of the movement were called Jesus people, or Jesus freaks.

Its predecessor, the charismatic movement, had already been in full swing for about a decade. It involved mainline Protestants and Roman Catholics who testified to having supernatural experiences similar to those recorded in the Acts of the Apostles, especially speaking in tongues. Both of these movements held that they were calling the church back to a more biblical picture of Christianity, in which the gifts of the Spirit would be restored to the Church.

The Jesus movement left a legacy that included the formation of various denominations as well as other Christian organizations, and it also influenced the development of both the contemporary Christian right and Christian left. It was foundational in several ongoing Christian cultural movements, including Jesus music's impact on contemporary Christian music, and the development of Christian media as a radio and film industry.

History

Origins
The terms Jesus movement and Jesus people were coined by Duane Pederson in his writings for the Hollywood Free Paper. In an interview with Sean Dietrich on August 19, 2006, Pederson said that he did not coin the phrase "Jesus people" but gave credit to a magazine/television interviewer who asked him if he was part of the "Jesus people" and thereafter credited Duane as the phrase's founder.

Growth and decline
Secular and Christian media exposure in 1971 and 1972 caused the Jesus movement to explode across the United States, attracting evangelical youth eager to identify with the movement. The Shiloh communities and the Children of God attracted many new believers while many other communes and fellowships sprang up.

Explo '72 was an event organized by Campus Crusade for Christ, held at the Cotton Bowl stadium in Dallas, and involved such conservative leaders as Bill Bright and Billy Graham. Many of the 80,000 young Jesus People attending Explo '72 discovered for the first time these and other traditional avenues of Christian worship and experience. Although Explo '72 marked the high-water mark of media interest, the Jesus movement continued at a grass roots level with smaller individual groups and communities.

The movement began to subside, largely concluding by the late 1980s, but left a major influence in Christian music, youth and church life.

Legacy
Although the Jesus movement lasted no more than a decade (except for the Jesus People USA which continues to exist in Chicago), its influence on Christian culture can still be seen. Thousands of converts moved into leadership positions in churches and parachurch organizations. The informality of the Jesus movement's music and worship affected almost all evangelical churches. Some of the fastest growing US denominations of the late 20th century, such as Calvary Chapel, Hope Chapel Churches, and the Vineyard Churches, trace their roots directly back to the Jesus movement, as do parachurch organizations like Jews for Jesus and the contemporary Christian music industry. Perhaps the most significant and lasting influence, however, was the growth of an emerging strand within evangelical Christianity that appealed to the contemporary youth culture.<ref>Eileen Luhr, "Witnessing Suburbia: Conservatives and Christian Youth Culture "... University of California Press(2009) "</ref>

Jesus music, which grew out of the movement, was very influential in the creation of various subgenres of contemporary Christian music during the late 20th and early 21st centuries, such as Jesus Culture and Hillsong in both America and the UK. This also led to the inclusion of new musical instruments in churches all over the world, such as guitars and drums, in addition to traditional musical instruments such as pianos and organs. Music in other parts of the world was also greatly influenced by the Jesus Movement, such as music in Central America and the UK. In Central America, Pentecostal churches under the charismatic movement began to compose spiritual music called coros (fast-paced hymns) which is normally accompanied by dancing as worship.

The topic was the subject of the 2023 film Jesus Revolution.

Beliefs and practices

The Jesus movement was restorationist in theology, seeking to return to the original life of the early Christians.  As a result, Jesus people often viewed churches, especially those in the United States, as apostate, and took a decidedly countercultural political stance in general.  The theology of the Jesus movement also called for a return to simple living and asceticism in some cases. The Jesus people had a strong belief in miracles, signs and wonders, faith, healing, prayer, the Bible, and powerful works of the Holy Spirit. For example, a revival at Asbury College in 1970 grabbed the attention of the mainstream news media and became known nationwide.

The movement tended towards strong evangelism and millennialism. Some of the most read books by those within the movement included Ron Sider's Rich Christians in an Age of Hunger and Hal Lindsey's The Late Great Planet Earth.

Perhaps the most illustrative aspect of the Jesus movement was its communal aspect. Many Jesus people lived in communes. Although there were some groups, such as the Calvary Chapel movement, which did not live in communes, these remained more on the fringes of the Jesus movement. Within the commune, the group became more important than the individual and communal sharing of possessions was the norm. One example would be Graham Pulkingham's community described in his book They Left Their Nets. Some of the communes became somewhat authoritarian.

Jesus music

There has been a long legacy of Christian music connected to the Jesus movement. Jesus music, also known as gospel beat music in the UK, primarily began when street musicians of the late 1960s and early 1970s converted to Christianity. They continued to play the same style of music they had played previously but began to write lyrics with a Christian message. Many music groups developed out of this, and some became leaders within the Jesus movement, most notably Barry McGuire, Love Song, Second Chapter of Acts, All Saved Freak Band, Servant, Petra, Resurrection Band, Phil Keaggy, Paul Clark, Dion DiMucci, Paul Stookey of Peter, Paul, and Mary; Randy Stonehill, Randy Matthews, Andraé Crouch (and the Disciples), Nancy Honeytree, Keith Green, and Larry Norman. The Joyful Noise Band traveled with a Christian community throughout the U.S. and Europe, performing in festivals held underneath giant tents. In the UK, Malcolm and Alwyn were the most notable agents of the gospel beat.

According to The Jesus People: Old-Time Religion in the Age of Aquarius by Enroth, Ericson, and Peters, Chuck Smith of Calvary Chapel in Costa Mesa, California founded the first Christian rock labels when he launched the Maranatha! Music label in 1971 as an outlet for the Jesus music bands performing at Calvary worship services. However, in 1970 Larry Norman recorded, produced, and released two albums: Street Level and Born Twice for Randy Stonehill. on his own label, One Way Records.

Organizations

Belmont Avenue Church of Christ
Don Finto became involved with the Belmont Avenue Church of Christ (now simply Belmont Church), an ailing old inner city church in Nashville, Tennessee, YUS on Music Row between the public housing and several universities: Peabody, Vanderbilt and Belmont College etc. By the summer of 1971, the membership roll had dropped to about 75 elderly members. The church had mainstream roots in the Churches of Christ, but was transformed and firmly placed in the Jesus movement by an influx of countercultural Christians.

Seating ran out, with people sitting on the window sills or on the stage. It was not uncommon to find them walking the worst parts of Lower Broadway witnessing to sex workers and addicts. Within a year or two, the fellowship grew to hundreds and the famous Koinonia Coffee House was opened, being managed by Bill and Sherry Duguid at 1004 16th Avenue South, as it was known then, and a year or so later was led by Bob and Peggy Hughey. The second Koinonia building next door at 1000 16th Avenue S. (16th and Grand) had been an old "Five and Dime" store on Music Square that had closed down. The concerts held there on weekends helped east coast Christian music to grow in popularity. The house band was Dogwood, and various musicians regularly appeared on stage, including Dogwood, Amy Grant, Brown Bannister, Chris Christian, Don Francisco, Fireworks, Annie and Steve Chapman, Clay In The Potter's Hand and many others.

Calvary Chapel
Chuck Smith, founder and pastor of Calvary Chapel Costa Mesa, led with expositional verse-by-verse Bible studies. While he taught that the gifts seen and described in The New Testament were at work today there were Biblical restrictions on the exercise of those gifts among believers in their services. He baptized members in the Pacific Ocean. Unlike many other Christian movements, there was no single leader or figurehead of the Jesus movement. Some of the larger names include Duane Pederson, Jack Sparks, who led the Christian World Liberation Front, as well as Lonnie Frisbee, who worked for a time along with Smith. Frisbee was a key evangelist during the growth of the Calvary churches, while Smith was one of the few pastors who welcomed in the hippies who after coming to faith, eventually became known as Jesus people, and thus allowed for the dramatic future growth of his affiliate church network. Sparks and Pederson later became priests in the Eastern Orthodox Church. The international Potter's House Church (CFM) was birthed out of the International Church of the Foursquare Gospel, a church movement based in Los Angeles where Smith received his early theological training.

Fellowship House Church
Steve Freeman and others opened the Kingdom Come Christian Coffee House in Greenville, South Carolina, in 1971. Each Saturday night Jesus People gathered for worship, songs and fellowship. In 1972, several people who were highly involved in the Kingdom Come graduated from high schools and dispersed in several colleges and universities throughout the Southeastern United States and started a Fellowship House Church. Maynard Pittendreigh, Jay Holmes, and Freeman each established one at Erskine College, the University of South Carolina, and Furman University respectively.  Leadership moved from Steve Freeman to a charismatic preacher named Erskine Holt, a self-described apostle of the movement who lived in Florida. By 1973, nearly every campus throughout Florida, South Carolina, North Carolina, and Georgia had Fellowship House Churches. These generally died out by 1977, with many of the members moving to more traditional campus ministries. However, many moved onto similar ministries in such organizations as Calvary Chapel.

Jesus Army
In the UK, the Jesus Army (also known as the Jesus Fellowship Church and the Bugbrooke Community) was among the groups most influenced by the Jesus movement, embracing (former) hippies, bikers and drug addicts, among others.

Leaders and members of the Jesus Fellowship committed abuse of children and vulnerable adults, with several receiving custodial sentences.

The Jesus Fellowship Community Trust closed in December 2020 following the scandal, and issued a Closure Statement including an unreserved apology for the abuse that occurred in the Jesus Fellowship Church (JFC) and the residential New Creation Christian Community (NCCC).

Shiloh Youth Revival Centers
The Shiloh Youth Revival Centers movement was the largest Jesus People communal movement in the United States in the 1970s. Founded by John Higgins in 1968 as a small communal house in Costa Mesa, California, the movement quickly grew into a very large movement catering mostly to disaffected college-age youth. There were 100,000 people involved and 175 communal houses established during its lifespan. Two years after the movement's founding, Higgins and some of the core members of the movement bought  of land near Dexter, Oregon and built a new headquarters which they called "The Land".

See also
Operation Mobilization

References

Bibliography

 Di Sabatino, David. The Jesus People Movement: An Annotated Bibliography and General Resource (Westport, CT: Greenwood Press, 1999).
 Duchesne, Jean. Jesus Revolution: Made in U.S.A. (Paris: Éditions du Cerf, 1972)
 Graham, Billy. The Jesus Generation (Grand Rapids, MI: Zondervan, 1971).
 
 
 
 
 
 
 
 
 
 
 
 
 
 Ronald M. Enroth, Edward E. Ericson and C. Breckinridge Peters, The Jesus People: Old-Time Religion in the Age of Aquarius (Grand Rapids: William B. Eerdmans, 1972). 
 Larry Eskridge, "Jesus People" in Erwin Fahlbusch, Geoffrey William Bromiley, David B. Barrett, Encyclopedia of Christianity (Grand Rapids:William B. Eerdmans, 1999). 
 Donald Heinz, "The Christian World Liberation Front," in The New Religious Consciousness, Charles Y. Glock and Robert N. Bellah, eds. (Berkeley and Los Angeles: University of California Press, 1976) pp. 143–161. 
 Edward E. Plowman, The Jesus Movement'' (London: Hodder and Stoughton, 1972).

External links
 Hollywood Free Paper and Movement history 
 Time Magazine June, 1971: "The New Rebel Cry: Jesus Is Coming!"

 
Charismatic and Pentecostal Christianity
The Family International
Christian terminology
Evangelical movement